David McNarry (born 25 May 1948) is a UK Independence Party (UKIP) politician  in Northern Ireland, who was the leader of UKIP Northern Ireland from 2012 to 2016. He stood for the Ulster Unionist Party (UUP) in North Down in the 1982 Assembly elections but failed to be elected. He was first elected as a  Member of the Northern Ireland Assembly (MLA) for Strangford as an Ulster Unionist member in 2003 and subsequently re-elected in 2007 and again in 2011, before parting company with the UUP in 2012 and joining UKIP. He is a former UUP chief whip and education spokesman.

He is the current Assistant Grand Master of the Grand Orange Lodge of Ireland.

Political career

UUP
In 1973, he stood unsuccessfully as a pro-White Paper Unionist candidate in the election to the Northern Ireland Assembly, and unsuccessfully again, this time for the United Ulster Unionist Council, in the Constitutional Convention election of 1975. He was an unsuccessful candidate for the Ulster Unionist Party in the Northern Ireland Assembly election of 1982.

McNarry was selected in 2001 to contest the Strangford Westminster seat after the incumbent, John Taylor, announced he would be retiring. Iris Robinson of the Democratic Unionist Party was the eventual winner of the seat.

McNarry is a former local councillor and Deputy Mayor of Ards. Prior to his election to the Assembly, he was an adviser to First Minister of Northern Ireland David Trimble. He stood for the party leadership in 2005 along with Alan McFarland and Lord Reg Empey which Empey went on to win. Following the contest, he was appointed as the UUP education spokesman. He is a former chairman of the Ulster Young Unionist Council.

McNarry resigned from the UUP Assembly group on 27 January 2012 after being sacked by party leader Tom Elliott as the Vice Chair of the Assembly Education Committee. During an investigation by a UUP Disciplinary Committee, McNarry was suspended. The new leader Mike Nesbitt commented publicly that he was unlikely to offer McNarry the UUP whip on completion of the suspension.

A Northern Ireland Office (NIO) memo released in 2012 described him as "a dangerous nuisance".

UKIP
McNarry left the UUP and joined UKIP in October 2012, becoming UKIP's first MLA and first ever Member of a devolved Assembly in the United Kingdom. In 2013, McNarry was elected unopposed as the UKIP Leader in Northern Ireland. In the May 2014 local government elections, under McNarry's stewardship, UKIP gained two new local councillors in the region, taking the total number of UKIP councillors in Northern Ireland up to four. The party also received 24,584 (3.9%) first preference votes in the 2014 European election in Northern Ireland and although they failed to win a seat, this was a significant electoral performance.  At the September 2014 UKIP national conference in Doncaster, McNarry delivered a keynote speech which was warmly received by delegates. He received praise from commentators who referred to the speech as a "statesman-like" address. In the speech, he noted that UKIP was the only UK-wide party to have elected representation in each of the four parts of the UK. Under McNarry's stewardship, councillors from the DUP, TUV, and a former UUP Belfast Lord Mayor, Bob Stoker, defected to the party.

In the 2015 United Kingdom general election, UKIP failed to have a candidate elected, but in terms of votes finished as the highest performing of the non-Executive parties in Northern Ireland, receiving 18,324 (2.6%) votes whilst only fielding candidates in ten of the available eighteen seats. Prior to the 2016 Northern Ireland Assembly election, McNarry announced his intention to retire from front-line politics. He did not seek re-election to his Strangford seat, but he did represent the party as its Spokesman in the media during the election campaign. In the election, UKIP fielded 13 candidates and drew 10,109 (1.5%) votes.

In 2016, McNarry said that "foreigners" should be deported from the UK for not paying parking tickets. McNarry was asked by radio presenter Stephen Nolan to clarify UKIP's position. Nolan asked, "If a foreigner gets a parking ticket, they will be deported?" Mr McNarry replied: "Yes." Nolan then said, "So a Polish doctor working really hard in our health service overstays his 30 minute parking, gets a parking ticket. He will be deported?" Mr McNarry replied, "It's a crime, yes." 

In November 2016, McNarry's term of Office as UKIP Leader in Northern Ireland formally ended when the party elected its new national leader.

McNarry remains a supporter of UKIP –  but is no longer actively involved in party politics. He sits as a board member of the Ulster-Scots Agency. He is also active as a political commentator in the local media.

References

External links
 NI assembly biography
 UKIP Northern Ireland official website

1948 births
Living people
Ulster Unionist Party MLAs
Northern Ireland MLAs 2003–2007
Northern Ireland MLAs 2007–2011
Northern Ireland MLAs 2011–2016
Members of Ards Borough Council
UK Independence Party MLAs